"Still Hanging 'Round" is the fifteenth single by Australian pub rock band Hunters & Collectors, released on 1 February 1988. It was released as the second single from Hunters & Collectors' fifth studio album What's a Few Men?, which peaked at No. 48 on the Recorded Music NZ. The B-side, “John Riley”, is a remake of a traditional song, the original version is by B. Gibson and R. Neff. "Still Hanging 'Round" was covered by Cloud Control on the tribute album, Crucible – The Songs of Hunters & Collectors (September 2013).

Track listing

Reception 

The Canberra Times reviewer observed, "'Still Hanging 'Round' is not any different from anything else they have done none since they got bored with being boring. A song about a maudlin drunk, while not being anything new it is still enjoyable." While Phil of Tharunka felt, "[it] is one of the weaker tracks from the What's a Few Men? album, its view of love through the bottom of a beer glass still far exceeds ninety-five percent of the crap on radio."

Personnel

 John Archer – bass guitar
 Doug Falconer – drums
 John 'Jack' Howard – trumpet
 Robert Miles – live sound, art director
 Mark Seymour – vocals, lead guitar
 Jeremy Smith – French horn
 Michael Waters – trombone, keyboards

Recording
 Producer – Hunters & Collectors, Greg Edward
 Engineer – Greg Edward
 Assistant engineer – Leanne Vallence
 Recording/mixing engineer – Robert Miles, Greg Edward
 Studio – Metropolis Audio, South Melbourne (recording, engineering, mixing)

Charts

References

External links

Hunters & Collectors – Still Hanging Around (7" single) at Discogs
Hunters & Collectors – Still Hanging Round (12' single) at Discogs

Hunters & Collectors songs
1988 songs
1988 singles
Mushroom Records singles
Songs written by Mark Seymour